Sarah Anna Matthews is a British physicist. She is professor and head of solar physics at University College London's Mullard Space Science Laboratory (MSSL). She is also chairperson of UK Solar Physics.

Biography 
Born in London, Matthews graduated from the University of Glasgow with a first class honours BSc in 1992, and remained in Glasgow to undertake a PhD in the study of solar flares under the supervision of John Campbell Brown. After being awarded her doctorate in 1996, she joined MSSL to work on the Solar and Heliospheric Observatory mission. She has remained a member of the Laboratory's solar physics group ever since, advancing from a lectureship and a readership to her current professorial chair. She is also the Director of Education and the programme director of the MSc course in Space Science and Engineering at MSSL's parent institution, University College London.

Research interests 
Matthews has a wide range of research interests within the field of solar physics. These include -

 Storage and release of energy in magnetic fields within the solar atmosphere. 
 Active region structure and evolution.
 Initiation and evolution of solar flares and coronal mass ejections.
 Formation mechanisms of sunquakes.
 Acceleration of solar energetic particles and space weather.
 Ground and space-based instrumentation for remote sensing observations.

Space missions 
 Principal investigator of the EUV Imaging Spectrometer (EIS) on board the Hinode spacecraft. 
 Co-investigator of EUV Imager (EUI) and EUV spectrometer (SPICE) on board the Solar Orbiter spacecraft

Awards 

 2020: James Dungey Lecturer

See also 
List of women in leadership positions on astronomical instrumentation projects

References 

Year of birth missing (living people)
Living people
Alumni of the University of Glasgow
British astrophysicists
21st-century British women scientists
20th-century British women scientists
20th-century British physicists
British women physicists
21st-century British physicists
Academics of UCL Mullard Space Science Laboratory
Academics of University College London
Women astrophysicists